Vortex Studio is a complete simulation software platform. It features a high-fidelity, realtime physics engine developed by CM Labs Simulations that simulates rigid body dynamics, collision detection, contact determination, and dynamic reactions. It also contains model import and preparation tools, an image generator, and networking tools for distributed simulation, accessed through a desktop editor via a GUI. Vortex adds accurate physical motion and interactions to objects in visual-simulation applications for operator training, mission planning, product concept validation, heavy machinery and robotics design and testing, haptics devices, immersive and virtual reality (VR) environments.

The Vortex Studio content creation platform and the C++ SDK have several modules that simulate physics-based particles, sensors, floating bodies, cable systems, earthmoving operations, grasping, and vehicles (wheeled or tracked). Vortex has a modular architecture: developers can integrate their projects into 3D visualization frameworks and deploy them in environments that contain software-in-the-loop (SIL), MATLAB, hardware-in-the-loop (HIL), and motion platform components.

History
Vortex Studio is developed by CM Labs Simulations Inc., a private company established in Montreal in 2001. CM Labs was created when the management of MathEngine Canada Inc. purchased a portion of the business from MathEngine PLC, the parent company in the UK. MathEngine Canada Inc. was originally the research and development team responsible for creating the Karma physics simulation engine for computer games.

CM Labs shifted its focus away from gaming. It now supports two distinct markets, visual simulation for training (VST), targeting Vortex at robotics and heavy-equipment operator training in both commercial and military applications, and heavy equipment prototyping and engineering, targeting mostly manufacturers and academia. 

Vortex Studio has been under active development ever since the initial launch of the software in 2001. It usually has three releases per year (a, b and c).

Use
Vortex has been employed in a wide range of commercial, military, and academic projects. To date, it has been used to simulate vehicles, robotics, and heavy equipment in hundreds of construction, mining, forestry, marine, subsea, planetary, academic, and military environments. It has also been used to simulate the movements and behaviour of animals and insects for scientific purposes. Sample examples are:

 The Explosive Ordnance Disposal (EOD) robot  simulator developed by the European Aeronautic Defence and Space Company (EADS) for training purposes. EADS uses Vortex to model the physical behaviour of the robot as it maneuvers in its simulated environment, interacting with other objects while processing user commands.

 A driverless vehicle designed by Carnegie Mellon University’s Red Team Racing  for the DARPA Grand Challenge that uses Vortex for preplanning and onboard navigation to “accurately simulate the vehicle as it navigates the terrain, including both local area constraints and global path planning objectives.”

 Heavy-equipment operator training simulators such as tower crane, mobile crane, crawler crane, and concrete pump for the Operating Engineers Training Institute of Ontario and the International Union of Operating Engineers – Local 721. These simulators are used to prepare operators for proper equipment use and accident avoidance.

 Georgia State University’s AnimatLab project, which is a simulation software environment that models how the body and nervous system dynamically interact in a Vortex-governed virtual physical world where relevant neural and physical parameters can be observed and manipulated.

Books
 David M. Bourg, Physics for Game Developers. O’Reilly, 2001.
 Murilo G. Coutinho, Dynamic Simulations of Multibody Systems. Springer-Verlag, 2001.
 Jack B. Kuipers, Quaternions and Rotation Sequences. Princeton University Press, 1998.
 Cornelius Lanczos, The Variational Principles of Mechanics. Dover Books, 1986.

See also
 Collision detection
 Game physics
 Physics engine
 Rigid body dynamics
 Robotics simulator

References

External links
 CM Labs home page
 A Virtual Highway for Road Warriors, MT2 2008 Volume 13, Issue 6
 AnimatLab
 Dimajix Developer Blog
 The Daily Commercial News, May 12, 2008
 Visual Interactive Simulation Lecture, Spring 2005, Physics Engines

Computer physics engines
Rigid bodies
Virtual reality